Keraea is a genus of air-breathing land snails, terrestrial pulmonate gastropod mollusks in the family Geomitridae.

Species
Species within the genus Keraea include:
 Keraea bertholdiana (L. Pfeiffer, 1852)
 Keraea deflorata (R. T. Lowe, 1855) (uncertain)
 † Keraea garachicoensis (Wollaston, 1878) extinct
 Keraea gorgonarum (Dohrn, 1869)

References

http://www.mapress.com/zootaxa/2011/f/zt02911p049.pdf
fauna-eu.org
http://wwwlistado.blogspot.com/2011/04/familia-patulidae-tryon-1866.html

Geomitridae